The 1941 Kent State Golden Flashes football team was an American football team that represented Kent State University in the Ohio Athletic Conference (OAC) during the 1941 college football season. In their seventh season under head coach Donald Starn, the Golden Flashes compiled a 2–5–1 record.

The team won the first two games by a combined total of 84 to 0. It was the largest single-game point total in the history of the Kent State football program, surpassing the 54 points scored against Buffalo in 1938. The Golden Flashes scored 52 of their points in the second half, including 33 points in the fourth quarter.

In the final six games of the season, the Golden Flashes did not win another game and were outscored by a total of 100 to 25. 

The roster included an African-American back, Grady Jackson, a sophomore transfer student from Mercer. Joe Mileski was the team's quarterback and punter.

Schedule

References

Kent State
Kent State Golden Flashes football seasons
Kent State Golden Flashes football